Almecillin (INN), also known as penicillin O, is a penicillin  that is similar in antibiotic action to penicillin G. It is obtained by isolation from Penicillium chrysogenum.

References

Penicillins